Efmamj Jasond González Palacios (born 1999), known as Jasond González, is a Colombian professional footballer who plays as a forward for San Lorenzo.

Career
González started his career with Atlético Nacional in Colombia. In February 2019, González had a trial in Argentina with San Lorenzo; under Jorge Almirón, who noticed him whilst managing Atlético Nacional in 2018. He remained until September, when the forward signed his first professional contract with the club. He scored his first reserve goal in the succeeding October against Central Córdoba. On 26 November 2020, González headed out on loan to Primera B Nacional with All Boys; penning terms until December 2021. His senior debut arrived two days after signing in a goalless draw away to Brown.

González scored his first senior goal on 5 December 2020, for All Boys, against Santamarina at the Estadio Islas Malvinas.

Personal life
González's name, Efmamj Jasond, takes the first letter of every month in Spanish: Enero, Febrero, Marzo, Abril, Mayo, Junio + Julio, Agosto, Septiembre, Octubre, Noviembre and Diciembre. That is due to his parents liking the calendar. He prefers to be called Jasond.

Career statistics
.

Notes

References

External links

1999 births
Date of birth missing (living people)
Living people
Sportspeople from Antioquia Department
Colombian footballers
Association football forwards
Colombian expatriate footballers
Expatriate footballers in Argentina
Colombian expatriate sportspeople in Argentina
Primera Nacional players
San Lorenzo de Almagro footballers
All Boys footballers